Seoul Metropolitan City Route 92 is an urban road located in Gyeonggi Province and Seoul, South Korea. Nambu Beltway is a part of this route.

Stopovers

 Seoul
 Gangseo District - Yangcheon District - Guro District
 Gyeonggi Province
 Gwangmyeong
 Seoul
 Guro District - Geumcheon District - Gwanak District - Dongjak District - Seocho District - Gangnam District - Songpa District - Gangdong District

List of Facilities 
IS: Intersection, IC: Interchange

References

Roads in Gyeonggi
Roads in Seoul